This page lists all described genera and species of the spider family Anapidae. , the World Spider Catalog accepts 235 species in 58 genera:

A

Acrobleps
Acrobleps Hickman, 1979
 Acrobleps hygrophilus Hickman, 1979 (type) — Australia (Tasmania)

Algidiella
Algidiella Rix & Harvey, 2010
 Algidiella aucklandica (Forster, 1955) (type) — New Zealand (Auckland Is.)

Anapis
Anapis Simon, 1895
 Anapis amazonas Platnick & Shadab, 1978 — Colombia
 Anapis anabelleae Dupérré & Tapia, 2018 — Ecuador
 Anapis anchicaya Platnick & Shadab, 1978 — Colombia
 Anapis atuncela Platnick & Shadab, 1978 — Colombia
 Anapis calima Platnick & Shadab, 1978 — Colombia
 Anapis caluga Platnick & Shadab, 1978 — Peru
 Anapis carmencita Dupérré & Tapia, 2018 — Ecuador
 Anapis castilla Platnick & Shadab, 1978 — Peru, Brazil
 Anapis chiriboga Platnick & Shadab, 1978 — Ecuador
 Anapis choroni Platnick & Shadab, 1978 — Venezuela
 Anapis churu Dupérré & Tapia, 2018 — Ecuador
 Anapis circinata (Simon, 1895) — Venezuela
 Anapis digua Platnick & Shadab, 1978 — Colombia
 Anapis discoidalis (Balogh & Loksa, 1968) — Brazil
 Anapis felidia Platnick & Shadab, 1978 — Colombia
 Anapis guasca Platnick & Shadab, 1978 — Colombia
 Anapis heredia Platnick & Shadab, 1978 — Costa Rica
 Anapis hetschki (Keyserling, 1886) (type) — Brazil
 Anapis keyserlingi Gertsch, 1941 — Panama
 Anapis mariebertheae Dupérré & Tapia, 2018 — Ecuador
 Anapis meta Platnick & Shadab, 1978 — Colombia
 Anapis mexicana Forster, 1958 — Mexico, Belize
 Anapis minutissima (Simon, 1903) — Jamaica
 Anapis monteverde Platnick & Shadab, 1978 — Costa Rica
 Anapis naranja Dupérré & Tapia, 2018 — Ecuador
 Anapis nawchi Dupérré & Tapia, 2018 — Ecuador
 Anapis nevada Müller, 1987 — Colombia
 Anapis saladito Platnick & Shadab, 1978 — Colombia
 Anapis shina Dupérré & Tapia, 2018 — Ecuador

Anapisona
Anapisona Gertsch, 1941
 Anapisona aragua Platnick & Shadab, 1979 — Colombia, Venezuela
 Anapisona ashmolei Platnick & Shadab, 1979 — Ecuador
 Anapisona bolivari Georgescu, 1987 — Venezuela
 Anapisona bordeaux Platnick & Shadab, 1979 — Virgin Is., Brazil
 Anapisona furtiva Gertsch, 1941 — Panama
 Anapisona guerrai Müller, 1987 — Colombia
 Anapisona hamigera (Simon, 1898) — Panama, Colombia, Venezuela, St. Vincent
 Anapisona kartabo Forster, 1958 — Guyana
 Anapisona kethleyi Platnick & Shadab, 1979 — Mexico, Costa Rica
 Anapisona pecki Platnick & Shadab, 1979 — Ecuador
 Anapisona platnicki Brignoli, 1981 — Brazil
 Anapisona schuhi Platnick & Shadab, 1979 — Brazil
 Anapisona simoni Gertsch, 1941 (type) — Panama

Austropholcomma
Austropholcomma Rix & Harvey, 2010
 Austropholcomma florentine Rix & Harvey, 2010 (type) — Australia (Tasmania)
 Austropholcomma walpole Rix & Harvey, 2010 — Australia (Western Australia)

B

Borneanapis
Borneanapis Snazell, 2009
 Borneanapis belalong Snazell, 2009 (type) — Borneo

C

Caledanapis
Caledanapis Platnick & Forster, 1989
 Caledanapis dzumac Platnick & Forster, 1989 — New Caledonia
 Caledanapis insolita (Berland, 1924) — New Caledonia
 Caledanapis peckorum Platnick & Forster, 1989 (type) — New Caledonia
 Caledanapis pilupilu (Brignoli, 1981) — New Caledonia
 Caledanapis sera Platnick & Forster, 1989 — New Caledonia
 Caledanapis tillierorum Platnick & Forster, 1989 — New Caledonia

Chasmocephalon
Chasmocephalon O. Pickard-Cambridge, 1889
 Chasmocephalon acheron Platnick & Forster, 1989 — Australia (Victoria)
 Chasmocephalon alfred Platnick & Forster, 1989 — Australia (Victoria)
 Chasmocephalon eungella Platnick & Forster, 1989 — Australia (Queensland)
 Chasmocephalon flinders Platnick & Forster, 1989 — Australia (Western Australia)
 Chasmocephalon iluka Platnick & Forster, 1989 — Eastern Australia
 Chasmocephalon neglectum O. Pickard-Cambridge, 1889 (type) — Australia (Western Australia)
 Chasmocephalon pemberton Platnick & Forster, 1989 — Australia (Western Australia)
 Chasmocephalon tingle Platnick & Forster, 1989 — Australia (Western Australia)

Comaroma
Comaroma Bertkau, 1889
 Comaroma hatsushibai Ono, 2005 — Japan
 Comaroma maculosa Oi, 1960 — China, Korea, Japan
 Comaroma mendocino (Levi, 1957) — USA
 Comaroma nakahirai (Yaginuma, 1959) — Japan
 Comaroma simoni Bertkau, 1889 (type) — Europe
 Comaroma tongjunca Zhang & Chen, 1994 — China

Conculus

Conculus Kishida, 1940
 Conculus grossus (Forster, 1959) — New Guinea
 Conculus lyugadinus Kishida, 1940 (type) — China, Korea, Japan
 Conculus simboggulensis Paik, 1971 — Korea

Crassanapis
Crassanapis Platnick & Forster, 1989
 Crassanapis calderoni Platnick & Forster, 1989 — Chile
 Crassanapis cekalovici Platnick & Forster, 1989 — Chile, Argentina
 Crassanapis chaiten Platnick & Forster, 1989 — Chile
 Crassanapis chilensis Platnick & Forster, 1989 (type) — Chile
 Crassanapis contulmo Platnick & Forster, 1989 — Chile

Crozetulus
Crozetulus Hickman, 1939
 Crozetulus minutus Hickman, 1939 (type) — Crozet Is.
 Crozetulus rhodesiensis Brignoli, 1981 — Namibia, Zimbabwe, South Africa
 Crozetulus rotundus (Forster, 1974) — Congo
 Crozetulus scutatus (Lawrence, 1964) — South Africa

D

Dippenaaria
Dippenaaria Wunderlich, 1995
 Dippenaaria luxurians Wunderlich, 1995 (type) — South Africa

E

Elanapis
Elanapis Platnick & Forster, 1989
 Elanapis aisen Platnick & Forster, 1989 (type) — Chile

Enielkenie
Enielkenie Ono, 2007
 Enielkenie acaroides Ono, 2007 (type) — Taiwan

Eperiella
Eperiella Rix & Harvey, 2010
 Eperiella alsophila Rix & Harvey, 2010 (type) — Chile
 Eperiella hastings Rix & Harvey, 2010 — Australia (Tasmania)

Epigastrina
Epigastrina Rix & Harvey, 2010
 Epigastrina fulva (Hickman, 1945) (type) — Australia (Tasmania)
 Epigastrina loongana Rix & Harvey, 2010 — Australia (Tasmania)
 Epigastrina typhlops Rix & Harvey, 2010 — Australia (Tasmania)

Eterosonycha
Eterosonycha Butler, 1932
 Eterosonycha alpina Butler, 1932 (type) — Australia (New South Wales, Victoria, Tasmania)
 Eterosonycha aquilina Rix & Harvey, 2010 — Australia (New South Wales, Victoria, Tasmania)
 Eterosonycha complexa (Forster, 1959) — Australia (New South Wales)
 Eterosonycha ocellata Rix & Harvey, 2010 — Australia (Victoria)

F

Forsteriola
Forsteriola Brignoli, 1981
 Forsteriola proloba (Forster, 1974) (type) — Burundi, Rwanda
 Forsteriola rugosa (Forster, 1974) — Congo

G

Gaiziapis
Gaiziapis Miller, Griswold & Yin, 2009
 Gaiziapis encunensis Lin & Li, 2012 — China
 Gaiziapis zhizhuba Miller, Griswold & Yin, 2009 (type) — China

Gertschanapis
Gertschanapis Platnick & Forster, 1990
 Gertschanapis shantzi (Gertsch, 1960) (type) — USA

Gigiella
Gigiella Rix & Harvey, 2010
 Gigiella milledgei Rix & Harvey, 2010 (type) — Australia (Victoria, Tasmania)
 Gigiella platnicki Rix & Harvey, 2010 — Chile

Guiniella
Guiniella Rix & Harvey, 2010
 Guiniella tropica (Forster, 1959) (type) — New Guinea

H

Hickmanapis
Hickmanapis Platnick & Forster, 1989
 Hickmanapis minuta (Hickman, 1944) — Australia (Tasmania)
 Hickmanapis renison Platnick & Forster, 1989 (type) — Australia (Tasmania)

Holarchaea
Holarchaea Forster, 1955
 Holarchaea globosa (Hickman, 1981) — Australia (Tasmania)
 Holarchaea novaeseelandiae (Forster, 1949) (type) — New Zealand

M

Mandanapis
Mandanapis Platnick & Forster, 1989
 Mandanapis cooki Platnick & Forster, 1989 (type) — New Caledonia

Maxanapis
Maxanapis Platnick & Forster, 1989
 Maxanapis bartle Platnick & Forster, 1989 (type) — Australia (Queensland)
 Maxanapis bell Platnick & Forster, 1989 — Australia (Queensland)
 Maxanapis bellenden Platnick & Forster, 1989 — Australia (Queensland)
 Maxanapis burra (Forster, 1959) — Australia (Queensland, New South Wales)
 Maxanapis crassifemoralis (Wunderlich, 1976) — Australia (Queensland, New South Wales)
 Maxanapis dorrigo Platnick & Forster, 1989 — Australia (New South Wales)
 Maxanapis mossman Platnick & Forster, 1989 — Australia (Queensland)
 Maxanapis tenterfield Platnick & Forster, 1989 — Australia (Queensland, New South Wales)
 Maxanapis tribulation Platnick & Forster, 1989 — Australia (Queensland)

Metanapis
Metanapis Brignoli, 1981
 Metanapis bimaculata (Simon, 1895) — South Africa
 Metanapis mahnerti Brignoli, 1981 (type) — Kenya
 Metanapis montisemodi (Brignoli, 1978) — Nepal
 Metanapis plutella (Forster, 1974) — Congo
 Metanapis tectimundi (Brignoli, 1978) — Nepal

Micropholcomma
Micropholcomma Crosby & Bishop, 1927
 Micropholcomma bryophilum (Butler, 1932) — Australia (Queensland to Tasmania)
 Micropholcomma caeligenum Crosby & Bishop, 1927 (type) — Australia (Victoria)
 Micropholcomma junee Rix & Harvey, 2010 — Australia (Tasmania)
 Micropholcomma linnaei Rix, 2008 — Australia (Western Australia)
 Micropholcomma longissimum (Butler, 1932) — Australia (Queensland to Tasmania)
 Micropholcomma mirum Hickman, 1944 — Australia (Tasmania)
 Micropholcomma parmatum Hickman, 1944 — Australia (Tasmania)
 Micropholcomma turbans Hickman, 1981 — Australia (Tasmania)

Minanapis
Minanapis Platnick & Forster, 1989
 Minanapis casablanca Platnick & Forster, 1989 — Chile
 Minanapis floris Platnick & Forster, 1989 — Chile
 Minanapis menglunensis Lin & Li, 2012 — China
 Minanapis palena Platnick & Forster, 1989 — Chile, Argentina
 Minanapis talinay Platnick & Forster, 1989 (type) — Chile

Montanapis
Montanapis Platnick & Forster, 1989
 Montanapis koghis Platnick & Forster, 1989 (type) — New Caledonia

N

Normplatnicka
Normplatnicka Rix & Harvey, 2010
 Normplatnicka barrettae Rix & Harvey, 2010 — Australia (Western Australia)
 Normplatnicka chilensis Rix & Harvey, 2010 — Chile
 Normplatnicka lamingtonensis (Forster, 1959) (type) — Australia (Queensland, New South Wales, Victoria)

Nortanapis
Nortanapis Platnick & Forster, 1989
 Nortanapis lamond Platnick & Forster, 1989 (type) — Australia (Queensland)

Novanapis

Novanapis Platnick & Forster, 1989
 Novanapis spinipes (Forster, 1951) (type) — New Zealand

O

Octanapis
Octanapis Platnick & Forster, 1989
 Octanapis cann Platnick & Forster, 1989 (type) — Australia (New South Wales, Victoria)
 Octanapis octocula (Forster, 1959) — Australia (Queensland)

Olgania
Olgania Hickman, 1979
 Olgania cracroft Rix & Harvey, 2010 — Australia (Tasmania)
 Olgania eberhardi Rix & Harvey, 2010 — Australia (Tasmania)
 Olgania excavata Hickman, 1979 (type) — Australia (Tasmania)
 Olgania troglodytes Rix & Harvey, 2010 — Australia (Tasmania)
 Olgania weld Rix & Harvey, 2010 — Australia (Tasmania)

P

Paranapis
Paranapis Platnick & Forster, 1989
 Paranapis insula (Forster, 1951) (type) — New Zealand
 Paranapis isolata Platnick & Forster, 1989 — New Zealand

Patelliella
Patelliella Rix & Harvey, 2010
 Patelliella adusta Rix & Harvey, 2010 (type) — Australia (Lord Howe Is.)

Pecanapis
Pecanapis Platnick & Forster, 1989
 Pecanapis franckei Platnick & Forster, 1989 (type) — Chile

Pseudanapis
Pseudanapis Simon, 1905
 Pseudanapis aloha Forster, 1959 — Japan, Hawaii, Caroline Is., Australia (Queensland). Introduced to Britain, Germany
 Pseudanapis amrishi (Makhan & Ezzatpanah, 2011) — Suriname
 Pseudanapis benoiti Platnick & Shadab, 1979 — Congo
 Pseudanapis domingo Platnick & Shadab, 1979 — Ecuador
 Pseudanapis gertschi (Forster, 1958) — Mexico, Costa Rica, Panama
 Pseudanapis hoeferi Kropf, 1995 — Brazil
 Pseudanapis namkhan Lin, Li & Jäger, 2013 — Laos
 Pseudanapis parocula (Simon, 1899) (type) — Laos, Malaysia, Indonesia (Sumatra, Java)
 Pseudanapis plumbea Forster, 1974 — Congo
 Pseudanapis schauenbergi Brignoli, 1981 — Mauritius, Réunion
 Pseudanapis serica Brignoli, 1981 — China (Hong Kong)
 Pseudanapis wilsoni Forster, 1959 — New Guinea

Pua
Pua Forster, 1959
 Pua novaezealandiae Forster, 1959 (type) — New Zealand

Q

Queenslanapis
Queenslanapis Platnick & Forster, 1989
 Queenslanapis lamington Platnick & Forster, 1989 (type) — Australia (Queensland)

R

Raveniella
Raveniella Rix & Harvey, 2010
 Raveniella apopsis Rix & Harvey, 2010 — Australia (New South Wales)
 Raveniella arenacea Rix & Harvey, 2010 — Australia (Western Australia)
 Raveniella cirrata Rix & Harvey, 2010 — Australia (Western Australia)
 Raveniella hickmani (Forster, 1959) — Australia (Tasmania)
 Raveniella janineae Rix & Harvey, 2010 — Australia (Western Australia)
 Raveniella luteola (Hickman, 1945) (type) — Australia (Queensland to Tasmania)
 Raveniella mucronata Rix & Harvey, 2010 — Australia (Western Australia)
 Raveniella peckorum Rix & Harvey, 2010 — Australia (Western Australia)
 Raveniella subcirrata Rix & Harvey, 2010 — Australia (Western Australia)

Rayforstia
Rayforstia Rix & Harvey, 2010
 Rayforstia antipoda (Forster, 1959) — New Zealand
 Rayforstia insula (Forster, 1959) — New Zealand
 Rayforstia lordhowensis Rix & Harvey, 2010 — Australia (Lord Howe Is.)
 Rayforstia mcfarlanei (Forster, 1959) — New Zealand
 Rayforstia plebeia (Forster, 1959) — New Zealand
 Rayforstia propinqua (Forster, 1959) — New Zealand
 Rayforstia raveni Rix & Harvey, 2010 — Australia (Queensland)
 Rayforstia salmoni (Forster, 1959) — New Zealand
 Rayforstia scuta (Forster, 1959) — New Zealand
 Rayforstia signata (Forster, 1959) — New Zealand
 Rayforstia vulgaris (Forster, 1959) (type) — New Zealand
 Rayforstia wisei (Forster, 1964) — New Zealand (Campbell Is.)

Risdonius
Risdonius Hickman, 1939
 Risdonius barrington Platnick & Forster, 1989 — Australia (New South Wales)
 Risdonius lind Platnick & Forster, 1989 — Australia (Victoria)
 Risdonius parvus Hickman, 1939 (type) — Australia (New South Wales to Tasmania)

S

Sheranapis
Sheranapis Platnick & Forster, 1989
 Sheranapis bellavista Platnick & Forster, 1989 (type) — Chile
 Sheranapis quellon Platnick & Forster, 1989 — Chile
 Sheranapis villarrica Platnick & Forster, 1989 — Chile

Sinanapis
Sinanapis Wunderlich & Song, 1995
 Sinanapis crassitarsa Wunderlich & Song, 1995 (type) — China, Laos, Vietnam
 Sinanapis longituba Lin & Li, 2012 — China (Hainan)
 Sinanapis medogensis Zhang & Lin, 2018 — China
 Sinanapis wuyi Jin & Zhang, 2013 — China

Sofanapis
Sofanapis Platnick & Forster, 1989
 Sofanapis antillanca Platnick & Forster, 1989 (type) — Chile

Spinanapis
Spinanapis Platnick & Forster, 1989
 Spinanapis darlingtoni (Forster, 1959) — Australia (Queensland)
 Spinanapis frere Platnick & Forster, 1989 — Australia (Queensland)
 Spinanapis julatten Platnick & Forster, 1989 — Australia (Queensland)
 Spinanapis ker Platnick & Forster, 1989 (type) — Australia (Queensland)
 Spinanapis lewis Platnick & Forster, 1989 — Australia (Queensland)
 Spinanapis monteithi Platnick & Forster, 1989 — Australia (Queensland)
 Spinanapis thompsoni Platnick & Forster, 1989 — Australia (Queensland)
 Spinanapis thornton Platnick & Forster, 1989 — Australia (Queensland)
 Spinanapis yeatesi Platnick & Forster, 1989 — Australia (Queensland)

T

Taliniella
Taliniella Rix & Harvey, 2010
 Taliniella nigra (Forster, 1959) (type) — New Zealand
 Taliniella vinki Rix & Harvey, 2010 — New Zealand

Taphiassa
Taphiassa Simon, 1880
 Taphiassa castanea Rix & Harvey, 2010 — Australia (Tasmania)
 Taphiassa globosa Rix & Harvey, 2010 — Australia (Western Australia)
 Taphiassa impressa Simon, 1880 (type) — New Caledonia
 Taphiassa magna Rix & Harvey, 2010 — Australia (Lord Howe Is.)
 Taphiassa punctata (Forster, 1959) — New Zealand
 Taphiassa punctigera Simon, 1895 — Sri Lanka
 Taphiassa robertsi Rix & Harvey, 2010 — Australia (Western Australia)

Tasmanapis
Tasmanapis Platnick & Forster, 1989
 Tasmanapis strahan Platnick & Forster, 1989 (type) — Australia (Tasmania)

Teutoniella
Teutoniella Brignoli, 1981
 Teutoniella cekalovici Platnick & Forster, 1986 — Chile
 Teutoniella plaumanni Brignoli, 1981 (type) — Brazil

Tinytrella
Tinytrella Rix & Harvey, 2010
 Tinytrella pusilla (Forster, 1959) (type) — New Zealand

Tricellina
Tricellina Forster & Platnick, 1989
 Tricellina gertschi (Forster & Platnick, 1981) (type) — Chile

V

Victanapis
Victanapis Platnick & Forster, 1989
 Victanapis warburton Platnick & Forster, 1989 (type) — Australia (Victoria)

Z

Zangherella
Zangherella Caporiacco, 1949
 Zangherella algerica (Simon, 1895) (type) — Italy, Algeria, Tunisia
 Zangherella apuliae (Caporiacco, 1949) — Italy, Greece, Turkey
 Zangherella relicta (Kratochvíl, 1935) — Montenegro, Bulgaria

Zealanapis

Zealanapis Platnick & Forster, 1989
 Zealanapis armata (Forster, 1951) (type) — New Zealand
 Zealanapis australis (Forster, 1951) — New Zealand
 Zealanapis conica (Forster, 1951) — New Zealand
 Zealanapis insula Platnick & Forster, 1989 — New Zealand
 Zealanapis kuscheli Platnick & Forster, 1989 — New Zealand
 Zealanapis matua Platnick & Forster, 1989 — New Zealand
 Zealanapis montana Platnick & Forster, 1989 — New Zealand
 Zealanapis otago Platnick & Forster, 1989 — New Zealand
 Zealanapis punta Platnick & Forster, 1989 — New Zealand
 Zealanapis waipoua Platnick & Forster, 1989 — New Zealand

References

Anapidae
Anapidae